Boca Chica Village, formerly Kennedy Shores, Kopernik Shores, is a small, unincorporated community in Cameron County, Texas, United States. It was formed in the late 1960s, and is still extant as of 2021, although the village proper has changed greatly since 2018 as industrial business enterprises came to purchase much of the land of the village.

In 2014, the village was chosen as the location for the construction of a control facility for the SpaceX South Texas launch site, while the launch site itself was slated to be built just 2 miles further east, adjacent to Boca Chica State Park on the Texas Gulf Coast. Flight testing—and even more frequent ground testing—of prototype rocket vehicles and rocket engines began in 2019 and has continued into 2021.

In March 2021, Elon Musk announced plans to incorporate a new city to be called Starbase, Texas in the area. Starbase is expected to include the existing Boca Chica Village, the SpaceX test site and launch site, and more of the surrounding Boca Chica area.

History

Early history
The town was founded as Kennedy Shores in 1967 by John Caputa, a Chicagoan property developer, and was initially aimed at working-class Polish migrants. After building a community of about 30 ranch-style houses, the settlement was devastated by Hurricane Beulah later that year, which destroyed the restaurant and public utility systems. Electricity was restored, but many of the homes did not have potable water even decades later.

In 1975, local resident Stanley Piotrowicz was voted in as town mayor, who renamed the village Kopernik Shores after Nicolaus Copernicus, and attempted to have the village recognized as an incorporated community, but this was denied. In 1990 and 2000, the population was 26 people. As of 2008, only six people were permanent residents of the village, and that number was down to four people in two homes by 2017, with an average of approximately 12 seasonal residents.

SpaceX launch site 

In 2012, private space exploration company SpaceX named the Boca Chica area as a possible location for the construction of their future private commercial launch site. SpaceX started buying land in Boca Chica in 2012. Limited construction began that year, but more extensive construction activities did not begin until approximately 2018.

Flight testing of the SpaceX Starship with a newly designed Raptor rocket engine began in 2019 and has continued into 2021. With the village only a few miles from the test site Cameron County officials—following launch test permitting requirements set by the US regulatory authority, the FAA—began  in August 2019 to request residents to stand outside their homes during any tests that involve loading of propellant fuel, due to perceived danger from shock-wave induced broken windows in the event of a test anomaly and explosion.

The site has been criticized as a "sacrifice zone." It was seen as empty space by both SpaceX and the state which is exemplified by Elon Musk saying ‘we’ve got a load of land with nobody around, so if it blows up, its cool’ in 2018. At the time of its construction, many of the villagers’ homes were bought out with the threat of eminent domain. The launch site is an area where ‘negative externalities’ are located making it a sacrifice zone.

In September 2019, SpaceX extended an offer to buy each of the houses in Boca Chica Village for three times the fair market value along with an offer of VIP invitations to future launch events. The amount of the offer was said to be "non-negotiable". Homeowners were initially given two weeks for that particular offer to remain valid.
Some Boca Chica property owners were happy with the offer and made plans to accept but other owners were not, noting that they had made substantial improvements to their properties and that the base valuation used by the September process used county tax assessment valuations and did not look at the specifics of each house so could not be a full appraised valuation. The Houston Chronicle reported that the county seems to be taking a broader view of what is best for the "local economy, educational system, and quality of living in a region that is one of the poorest in the state." Cameron County Judge Eddie Treviño Jr. specifically mentioned consideration of the "450,000, 500,000 people that make up Cameron County, and the other million that make up the Valley, and also all the residents of Texas ... [though] it is terrible, personally, for those 10 or 20 remaining residential owners" in Boca Chica Village.
The New York Times reported in late September that SpaceX extended the original two-week offer period by three weeks, in order to allow property owners to work with the county appraiser in order to potentially get their assessed valuations adjusted upward based on improvements beyond what the previous appraisal understood.
Many residents who accepted purchase offers had moved away by March 2020.
A small number of house owners in Boca Chica Village did not accept the 2019 offer from SpaceX and remained in the village in October 2020, one year after the initial purchase offers from SpaceX were made to residents. "David Finlay, SpaceX’s Senior Director of Finance, told Boca Chica Village residents that this would be SpaceX’s final and best offer, and threatened the company would need to pursue alternate means to obtain the homes if the people of Boca Chica Village turned down the money. ... 'the scale and frequency of spaceflight activities at the site continue to accelerate, your property will frequently fall within established hazard zones in which no civilians will be permitted to remain, in order to comply with all federal and other public safety regulations. This email therefore represents SpaceX’s best and final purchase offer."

Proposed incorporation into "Starbase", Texas

In March 2021, Elon Musk stated that he intends to incorporate Boca Chica Village into Starbase, Texas. A Cameron County judge indicated then that the county's commissioners court "were informed of SpaceX's endeavor", and said that SpaceX "must abide by all state incorporation statutes".

Starbase is anticipated to include the land in Boca Chica Village proper—where both the legacy house community and the SpaceX build site are located—as well as the land where the SpaceX test site and launch site is located, and more since Starbase is to be a municipality "much larger than Boca Chica."

See also

Boca Chica area summary 
Palmito Ranch Battlefield
Del Valle, Texas
Leesville, Texas
Interstate 69 in Texas

References

External links 
 

Unincorporated communities in Cameron County, Texas
Unincorporated communities in Texas